Ulbo Garvema is a 1917 Dutch silent film directed by Maurits Binger.

Cast
 Frederick Vogeding - Baron van Walden / Alfred
 Cor Smits - Jan van Oort
 Annie Bos - Jan van Oort's dochter / Jonge Anna
 Jan van Dommelen - Hendrik
 Antoinette Sohns - Gravin
 Paula de Waart - Jan van Oort's vrouw
 Lily Bouwmeester - Anna als kind
 Pierre Perin - Anna's verloofde
 Lola Cornero - Meid
 Fred Homann - Dokter
 Ernst Winar

External links 
 

1917 films
Dutch silent feature films
Dutch black-and-white films
Films directed by Maurits Binger